The Governor of Saint Petersburg (Губернатор Санкт-Петербурга) is the head of the executive branch of Saint Petersburg City Administration. The governor's office administers all city services, public property, police and fire protection, most public agencies, and enforces all city and state laws within all districts of the City of Saint Petersburg. The governor's office is located in Smolny Institute and appoints many officials, including deputy governors and directors (heads of city departments).

Under the Soviet regime, until 1991 the head of the city administration was called chairperson of the executive committee. Between 1991 and 1996, the head of the administration was called Mayor after which they were called Governor. Between 1991 and 2006 the mayor/governor was elected by direct vote of city residents. Between 2004 and 2014, the governor was nominated by the President of the Russian Federation and approved (or disapproved) by the City Legislative Assembly, and since 2014 the governor has been elected by popular vote of city residents.

List of heads of administration of Saint Petersburg

Chairpersons of the Executive Committee (1917–1991)

Governors of Saint Petersburg (1991–present)

Timeline

Latest election

See also
Mayor of Moscow
Governor of Sevastopol (Russia)
Saint Petersburg City Administration
Saint Petersburg Police

References

Government of Saint Petersburg
Saint Petersburg
 
Saint Petersburg